U.S. Regulatory Trade Law is a sub-discipline of international trade law. Its focus is on the U.S. Government's (USG) various agencies' administrative rules, regulations and policies that govern the movement of goods and services into and out of the United States and the movement of licensed U.S. goods throughout the world. Adherence to the regulations is generically referred to as "international trade compliance."

Agencies and Laws Impacting this Discipline

Bureau of Industry and Security (U.S. Department of Commerce) – Export Administration Regulations (CFR-38) (15 CFR 732-774);
Directorate of Defense Trade Controls (U.S. State Department) – International Traffic in Arms Regulations ((22 CFR 120-130)) Arms Export Control Act( 22 USC 2778);
U.S. Arms Control Act  (8 USC 1101, 8 USC 1324, 22 USC 2794 and 2779));
U.S. Customs and Border Protection (U.S. Department of Homeland Security) – (CFR-Title 19); 
Harmonized Tariff Schedule & Schedule B;
Office of Foreign Asset Control (U.S. Treasury Department) (31 CFR 500-599)
Foreign Corrupt Practice Act (15 USC 2B);
ATF & E (U.S. Department of Justice) (27 CFR Part 478) (18 USC Chapter 44) and others.
Acts of Congress that impact trade and
U.S. Treaties impacting trade
NAFTA
Incoterms
Foreign Compliance Regimens
Wassenaar Arrangement

U.S. History
This sub-discipline gained prominence shortly after the terrorist attacks on the U.S. on September 11, 2001, when USG agencies stepped up their effort to protect America's borders and trade from terrorist's attacks and to protect the nation's national security interest. More than 20 USG agencies' rules, regulations and doctrines fall within the discipline.

Objectives of U.S. Regulatory Trade Law as a discipline
Unlike the broader discipline of international trade law, which is concerned with commerce between nations, this discipline's focus is on the sovereign nation regulations impacting the actual movement of goods across the nation's borders.

This legal discipline assembles and codifies the USG's Code of Federal Regulations and major USG agency's rules, regulations and policies that govern all aspects of international trade into meaningful terms for the legal practitioner needing to mitigate the risks associated with conducting international trade in compliance with all U.S. rules and regulations.

Foreign trade of the United States